John William Maund (c.1876 – c.1962) was a rugby union player who represented Australia.

Maund, a fullback, was born in Bathurst, NSW and claimed one international rugby cap for Australia. His debut game was against New Zealand, at Sydney, on 15 August 1903.

References

Australian rugby union players
Australia international rugby union players
1870s births
1962 deaths
Rugby union players from New South Wales
Rugby union fullbacks